Events from the year 1794 in Denmark.

Incumbents
 Monarch – Christian VII
 Prime minister – Andreas Peter Bernstorff

Events

 January 3 – Aarhus Stiftstidende, a local newspaper based in Aarhus, is published for the first time.
 February 26 – The first Christiansborg Palace is destroyed in a fire.
 March 27 – Denmark-Norway and Sweden form a neutrality compact.
 June 11 – Friderich Christian Hager receives a commission as governor of the Danish Gold Coast.
 July– August – A large sstrike among carpenters and later some 2,000 other craftsmen hits Copenhagenresults in the arrest of more than 200 carpenters. It is met with a general strike involving more than 2,000 craftsmen.

Undated

Births
 4 March – Olaf Nikolas Olsen, cartographer (died 1848)
 21 March – Poul Martin Møller, academic, writer, and poet (died 1838)
 24 July – Johan Georg Forchhammer, mineralogist and geologist (died 1865)
 13 November – Frederick Christian II, Duke, prince and feudal magnate (died 1814)
 27 December – Christian Albrecht Bluhme, politician, prime minister of Denmark (died 1866)

Full date missing
 Jens Juel-Vind, chamberlain and landowner (died 1826)

Deaths
 26 April – Johan Foltmar, composer (b. c. 1714)
 8 August – Andreas Bodenhoff, businessman (died 1723)
 29 September – Edvard Stormm educator and writer (born 1749)
 29 November – Princess Sophia Frederica, princess of Denmark (born 1758)
 29 December  Hermann Abbestée, governor of Danish India (born 1728)

References

 
1790s in Denmark
Denmark
Years of the 18th century in Denmark